Frank J. Delfino (February 13, 1911 – February 19, 1997) was an American actor. Delfino had dwarfism, and most of his roles were related to his small stature. He remains best known for portraying the character of The Hamburglar in the McDonald's advertising campaign television commercial's over a 20-year period.

Early life and career 
Delfino was born in Brooklyn, New York. Standing 4 feet, 5 inches tall, he became a professional violinist and performed in "Midget Village" at the 1933 Chicago World's Fair.  Delfino began his professional acting career appearing as "Johnnie" selling cigarettes for Philip Morris.He subsequently appeared in advertisements for Curtis Candy, Little Caesars, Sprite, and Snickers. He first appeared in commercials for McDonald's, beginning in 1971 and continuing for more than 20 years, portraying The Hamburglar.

In 1949, Delfino moved to Los Angeles to perform in his own local cartoon show, Jupiter Mars from Out of the Stars. He made his feature film debut in 1956 with an uncredited role in The Court Jester. He later had minor parts in films such as Please Don't Eat the Daisies, Planet of the Apes, and Willy Wonka & the Chocolate Factory. He also had more significant roles in productions including At the End of the Rainbow (aka: The Princess and the Magic Frog), The Odd Couple, Little Cigars, White House Madness, The Feather and Father Gang and Never Con a Killer.

Delfino and his wife, Sadie, also worked as stand-ins for well-known Hollywood child actors, including Mike Lookinland and Susan Olsen, who portrayed Bobby and Cindy Brady on The Brady Bunch. In addition to serving as stand-ins, the Delfinos appeared as "Kaplutian" extraterrestrials in one of the episodes of the final season of The Brady Bunch entitled, "Out of This World". One of Frank Delfino's last on-screen roles came in 1988, when he played a minor character in the TV series Circus.

Death 
Delfino died of bone marrow cancer at Mercy Hospital in San Diego, California on February 19, 1997, just six days after his 86th birthday.

Filmography

References

External links
 

1911 births
1997 deaths
Deaths from multiple myeloma
People from Brooklyn
Male actors from New York City
20th-century American male actors